Derek Stanley Arthur Warwick (born 27 August 1954) is a British former professional racing driver from England, who lives in Jersey. He raced for many years in Formula One, collecting four podiums but never winning a Grand Prix. He did, however, win the 1992 24 Hours of Le Mans and 1992 World Sportscar Championship.

In 2005 and 2006 he raced in the inaugural season of the Grand Prix Masters formula for retired Formula One drivers. He has served as the fourth steward for three Grands Prix in 2010 and 2011. He was president of the British Racing Drivers Club (2011-2017), succeeding Damon Hill and preceding Paddy Hopkirk.

Early life and career

Warwick was born in Alresford, Hampshire, England. He began his career in British stock car racing under the Spedeworth organisation at tracks such as his local Aldershot Stadium. He won the Superstox English Championship in 1971 (at the age of 16) and the World Championship at Wimbledon Stadium in 1973. His younger brother Paul also raced with some success in Superstox before progressing to Formula 3000, in which he was racing when killed in an accident in 1991.

Derek won the 1978 British Formula 3 Championship.

Formula One (1981–1993)

Warwick began his Formula One career with the fledgling F1 team Toleman for the 1981 season. He managed to qualify for only one race that year, the season finale at Las Vegas. Warwick had mainly dismal 1982 and 1983 seasons in the Toleman car, but bounced back, scoring points in the final four rounds of the 1983 championship.

He joined Renault in 1984 after Alain Prost left them at the end of 1983. Warwick, expecting to have a race-winning car, led the Brazilian Grand Prix, his first drive for them, only to retire because of a suspension failure caused by an early race wheel banging duel with the McLaren of Niki Lauda. Neither Warwick nor new teammate Patrick Tambay won a race in 1984, the first time since  that the team did not win a Grand Prix.

(The seat was then offered to Nigel Mansell who, accepting the position, went on to win two races at the end of the season.) 1985 was a poor one for Renault and the team withdrew from Formula One at the end of the year. Renault's withdrawal, and Ayrton Senna's refusal to let Warwick join him as teammate at Lotus (using his contracted number one driver status in the team, Senna refused to have anyone but a pure #2 as his teammate as he believed Lotus were not capable of supporting two championship contending drivers), left Warwick without a team for the  season and he took up an offer to drive for Tom Walkinshaw's TWR Jaguar team in the World Sportscar Championship. Following the death of Elio de Angelis in a testing accident in May, however, Warwick was invited to take his place at Brabham. Unconfirmed rumours surfaced that Brabham owner Bernie Ecclestone had invited Warwick to take de Angelis's place as the Englishman was the only available top driver who had not actually contacted the team offering his services in the days following the Italian's untimely death. Warwick explained:

"I got a phone call from Bernie, who said that he really appreciated the fact that I didn't call him five minutes after Elio had died and would I like to drive for him."

As no Grands Prix clashed with his Sportscar commitments, Warwick was able to race in both world championships.

In 1987, Warwick moved to the Arrows team alongside his Jaguar teammate Eddie Cheever, ending the season with 3 points scored. The 1988 season saw an improvement on the Arrows performance due to the powerful Megatron (a re-badged BMW M12) engine and Warwick finished 7 times in the top 6, earning him 17 points and a respectable 8th position in the championship. His best race of the season was 4th in the Italian Grand Prix at Monza where he finished only half a second behind Cheever. Italy was also notable in that it was the first time since the beginning of 1987 that Arrows engine guru Heini Mader finally solved the problem with the FIA's mandatory pop-off valve which restricted turbo boost. For the first time this allowed both Warwick and Cheever to fully exploit the power of the  Megatron engine (restricted to 2.5 BAR boost in 1988) and be much closer to the front than they had been previously.

In 1989, victory eluded Warwick in two occasions. The first was in the Brazilian Grand Prix, when a disastrous pit-stop cost him more than the 17 seconds he finished behind winner Nigel Mansell. But the real heartbreak came in the Canadian Grand Prix, when Warwick drove superbly and was leading the wet race, only to have his Cosworth engine fail on lap 40 while in second place. Ayrton Senna, who had passed Warwick for the lead on lap 38, would himself retire when his McLaren's Honda V10 blew 3 laps from the finish. As Warwick was lapping much quicker than those behind him, including the V10 Williams-Renault of eventual winner Thierry Boutsen, it is possible he could have scored his first Grand Prix win had he finished. Reliability issues plagued Warwick's season and cost him good finishes in other races as well, resulting in only 7 points for the season, the last of his 3 years at Arrows.

For the 1990 season, 4 years after Senna's veto, Warwick finally drove for Lotus who in 1990 would be using the Lamborghini V12 engine. But the glory days of that team were over and the Lamborghini 3512 proved unreliable and Warwick ended the season with a meagre 3 points tally. His greatest achievement of the season happened at the 1990 Spanish Grand Prix where his teammate Martin Donnelly suffered a severe crash leaving Warwick to help morale at the team by qualifying in the top 10 only for the gearbox to fail 10 laps from the end. 

In 1992 Warwick tested an IndyCar Lola T92/00 for Hall/VDS Racing for 2 days at Mid-Ohio in the off-season, to assess a possible move to CART for 1993.  Ultimately he did not and instead returned to Formula 1.

Warwick had firm offers of paid drives for 1993 with Jordan and Footwork and ultimately chose the latter. Warwick returned to Formula 1 following a 3-year sabbatical and completed the full season in 1993, but managed to score only 4 points. He ended his career with a total of 71 Grand Prix points.

Some consider Warwick to be the best Formula One driver never to win a single race.

Sports and Touring cars

Warwick also competed successfully in sports car racing, winning the World Sportscar Championship in 1992, and was part of the Peugeot team which was victorious at the 24 hours of Le Mans race that year. He drove sports cars for Jaguar in 1986 and 1991.

Warwick raced in the British Touring Car Championship (BTCC) after retiring from Formula One, driving for the Alfa Romeo works team in 1995. Despite the team's dominating the previous year, their car was underdeveloped this time, leading to a poor season. In the first race of the season at Donington Park he crashed and flying debris broke a TV camera lens, an incident featured in the highlights screened by the BBC a week later, with commentator Murray Walker quipping that Warwick owed them £6,000 for the damage ("that'll be six grand please, Derek!"). After a year out of racing, he co-founded the Triple Eight Racing team that took over the running of the works Vauxhall 1997 BTCC entry, as well as owning three car dealerships in Southampton and Jersey. Originally set to be team principal, it was decided he would drive one of the cars alongside established Vauxhall driver John Cleland, winning a wet race at Knockhill in 1998. He retired from racing at the end of the year, but continued his involvement in the team for another 3 years.

Warwick now writes his F1 blog on the Sports social network champions365.com and operates a Honda franchise in Jersey.

Later life

In 2005 and 2006, Warwick raced in the inaugural season of the Grand Prix Masters formula for retired Formula One drivers. In 2010, he served as the fourth steward for the Spanish and Hungarian Grands Prix. In 2011, Warwick served as the fourth steward for the 2011 Turkish Grand Prix. This role is given only to former racing drivers who advise the stewards panel on incidents from a driver perspective. He was president of the British Racing Drivers Club, after succeeding Damon Hill. Paddy Hopkirk replaced him as president of the BRDC in 2016. 
In 2015, Warwick received treatment for bowel cancer.

Racing record

Career summary

† Not eligible for points due to being a guest driver.

Complete European Formula Two Championship results
(key) (Races in bold indicate pole position; races in italics indicate fastest lap)

Complete Formula One results
(key) (Races in bold indicate pole position; Races in italics indicate fastest lap)

 Driver did not finish the Grand Prix, but was classified as he completed over 90% of the race distance.

24 Hours of Le Mans results

Complete British Touring Car Championship results
(key) (Races in bold indicate pole position – 1 point awarded 1996 onwards all races) (Races in italics indicate fastest lap) (* signifies that driver lead feature race for at least one lap – 1 point awarded in 1998 only)

Complete Bathurst 1000 results

* Super Touring race

Complete Grand Prix Masters results
(key) Races in bold indicate pole position, races in italics indicate fastest lap.

Complete Porsche Supercup results
(key) (Races in bold indicate pole position) (Races in italics indicate fastest lap)

† Not eligible for points due to being a guest driver.

Helmet
Warwick's helmet is blue with the entire chin area white and a white stripe running across the top, in the chin area there is a stripe on each side, his name written and a Union Jack.

References

External links

Derek Warwick's F1 Blog on Champions365.com 
Profile, champions365.com
Profile, funof1.com.ar

1954 births
24 Hours of Le Mans drivers
24 Hours of Le Mans winning drivers
Arrows Formula One drivers
Brabham Formula One drivers
BRDC Gold Star winners
British Formula Three Championship drivers
British Touring Car Championship drivers
English Formula One drivers
English racing drivers
FIA European Formula 3 Championship drivers
European Formula Two Championship drivers
Grand Prix Masters drivers
Living people
Team Lotus Formula One drivers
People from Alresford
Renault Formula One drivers
Porsche Supercup drivers
Toleman Formula One drivers
World Sportscar Championship drivers
British Formula One Championship drivers
Peugeot Sport drivers
Porsche Motorsports drivers
Jaguar Racing drivers